Stanley Arthur Cook (12 April 1873 – 26 September 1949) was Regius Professor of Hebrew at the University of Cambridge from 1932 to 1938.

Cook was born in King's Lynn, the son of John Thomas Cook of Leicester. He was educated at Wyggeston Grammar School, Leicester, and read the Semitic Languages tripos at Gonville and Caius College, Cambridge, where he graduated with first-class honours in 1894 and won the Mason Hebrew Prize and Jeremie Septuagint Prize. Employed for several years on the editorial staff of Encyclopedia Biblica, in 1904 he was appointed a college lecturer (at Caius) in Hebrew, a position he maintained until his appointment as Regius Professor in 1932. He was also a university lecturer in comparative religion from 1912 to 1920 and joint editor of The Cambridge Ancient History.

Cook married Annette Bell, who predeceased him. He died in Cambridge on 26 September 1949.

Select Publications
 Critical Notes on Old Testament History: the Traditions of Saul and David (1907) 
 The Religion of Ancient Palestine in the Second Millenium B.C. (1908)
 The Foundations of Religion (1914)
 The Study of Religions (1914)
 The Religion of Ancient Palestine in the Light of Archaeology (1930)
 Ethical Monotheism in the Light of Comparative Religion (1932)
 The Old Testament: a Reinterpretation (1936)
 The “Truth” of the Bible (1938)
 The Rebirth of Christianity (1942)

References

External links

 Archive Collections at the Faculty of Asian & Middle Eastern Studies library
 
 

Regius Professors of Hebrew (Cambridge)
1873 births
1949 deaths
Academics of the University of Cambridge
Alumni of Gonville and Caius College, Cambridge
Fellows of Gonville and Caius College, Cambridge
British Hebraists
People educated at Wyggeston Grammar School for Boys